Marianna Yelizarovna Tavrog (1921-2006) was a Soviet Russian documentary film director, Honored Artist of Russian Federation.

Biography
Born into a Jewish family on January 16, 1921, in the city of Taganrog, studied in Taganrog. Entered the Teachers' College in Moscow, and after the start of World War II had to evacuate to Alma-Ata and entered the VGIK, which was evacuated to Alma-Ata in 1941. Among her teachers were Leonid Trauberg and Grigory Kozintsev. After VGIK returned from evacuation to Moscow, Tavrog attended classes by Lev Kuleshov and Aleksandra Khokhlova.

Filmography
The main topics of Tavrog's documentaries were literature and art.

 1960 — Самуил Маршак
 1969 — Чукоккала
 1970 — Михаил Светлов
 1972 — Ритм стиха
 1972 — Один Тамм
 1977 — Мой дом открыт
 1977 — Лариса Рейснер
 1979 — Художник сказочных чудес
 1981 — Портрет
 1982 — Мне 100 лет
 1983 — Старые мастера («Centrnauchfilm»)
 1985 — Ради жизни на Земле
 1985 — Нащокинский домик
 1985 — Жизнь цвета
 1986 — От дедов к внукам
 1987 — Первый декабрист
 1988 — Страницы из жизни идеалиста
 1996 — Театр Марка Шагала
 1996 — Сентиментальный гротеск, или художники еврейского театра
 1999 - Евгений Онегин. Глава Х.

Footnotes

References
 Шмульян Г.Т. Таврог Марианна Елизаровна / Таганрог. Энциклопедия. — Таганрог: Антон, 2008. — С. 663. — .
 http://www.ng.ru/accent/2007-01-12/23_history.html
 http://www.gif.ru/afisha/tavrog/
 https://web.archive.org/web/20110721161533/http://www.mjcc.ru/news/67/index.html

1921 births
2006 deaths
People from Taganrog
Soviet film directors
Russian film directors
Russian women film directors